WJMC-FM (96.1 FM) is a radio station broadcasting a country music format. Licensed to Rice Lake, Wisconsin, United States, the station serves the Rice Lake-Spooner area.  The station is currently owned by TKC, Inc., and features programming from Westwood One.

The station broadcast on 96.3 FM during the 1980s as "Magic Country 96.3, WJMC."

References

External links

JMC-FM
Country radio stations in the United States
Radio stations established in 1979
1979 establishments in Wisconsin